Sigvald Bernhard Refsum (8 May 1907, Gransherad – 8 July 1991, Oslo) was a Norwegian neurologist and university teacher.

Biography
Sigvald Refsum studied medicine at University of Oslo and obtained his doctorate in 1946. He taught in University of Bergen from 1951, then from 1954 until his retirement in 1978 in University of Oslo. Refsum disease is named after him.

References

Norwegian neurologists
University of Oslo alumni
Academic staff of the University of Oslo
1907 births
1991 deaths
Members of the Norwegian Academy of Science and Letters